The 1981 New Jersey gubernatorial election was held on November 3. Republican Speaker of the Assembly Thomas Kean narrowly defeated Democratic U.S. Representative James Florio with 49.46% of the vote following a recount of the ballots. The difference between the two was less than 2,000 votes out of more than 2 million cast.

Primary elections were held on June 2. Kean and Florio, who had both been contenders in 1977, won plurality margins over crowded fields. Florio overcame a large primary field, including fellow Representative Robert A. Roe, four State Senators, the mayors of Newark and Jersey City, and N.J. Attorney General John J. Degnan, by consolidating support in South Jersey. Kean had fewer challengers, most notably establishment favorite Pat Kramer and self-funded businessman Bo Sullivan.

The general election was framed as a referendum on the new presidency of Ronald Reagan, in particular Reagan's cuts to federal spending. On election night, the results were too close to call, but showed a Kean lead of less than 1,700. Florio petitioned for a recount, which expanded Kean's lead slightly, and Florio conceded on November 30.

Background
After narrowly surviving a primary challenge in 1977, Governor Brendan Byrne was re-elected to a second term in a come-from-behind victory over State Senator Raymond Bateman. However, Byrne was ineligible to run for a third term due to term limits.

The election of Ronald Reagan as President of the United States the year before (in particular Reagan's surprisingly easy victory in New Jersey) and the early impressions of the Reagan administration served as the backdrop for the 1981 campaign. Candidates in both parties emphasized their stances on the death penalty, federal and state tax policy, and deregulation.

Democratic primary

Candidates
Herbert J. Buehler, former State Senator from Point Pleasant Beach
John J. Degnan, New Jersey Attorney General
Frank J. Dodd, State Senator from West Orange
James Florio, U.S. Representative from Runnemede
Kenneth A. Gibson, Mayor of Newark
William J. Hamilton, State Senator from New Brunswick
Ann Klein, Human Services Commissioner, former Assemblywoman from Morristown, and candidate for Governor in 1973
Stella E. Mann
Barbara McConnell, State Assemblywoman from Flemington
Joseph P. Merlino, President of the New Jersey Senate from Trenton
Rose Zeidwerg Monyek
Robert A. Roe, U.S. Representative from Wayne and candidate for Governor in 1977
Thomas F. X. Smith, Mayor of Jersey City

Both Robert Roe and Jim Florio, who had run in 1977 against incumbent Governor Byrne, ran again.  Roe entered the race alongside New Jersey Senate President Joseph P. Merlino in late February. Merlino, who served as acting Governor during Byrne's frequent trips out of state, took the opportunity to announce his campaign from the governor's podium at the state Capitol Building. Florio entered shortly after, along with Attorney General John J. Degnan.

Campaign
The incredibly large primary field led candidates to define themselves on the issues, taking bold positions and trying to make the competition look unexciting by comparison. Most of the campaign was dominated by Florio and Roe, the best known candidates on the basis of their 1977 challenge to Byrne. However, they remained in Washington, D.C. for much of the campaign, allowing a number of challengers to gain attention.

Byrne's supporters, who tended to be more liberal, split between several candidates. John J. Degnan was seen as Byrne's hand-picked successor, but Merlino, Kenneth A. Gibson, whose support had been critical to Byrne's 1977 primary win, gained key support from black voters. Barbara McConnell and Thomas F. X. Smith also drew from the Byrne coalition. Much was made of Governor Byrne decision to endorse a candidate. For months, he demurred, praising several candidates including Degnan, Florio and Merlino for preserving the Pine Barrens, Merlino for his position on firearms, William J. Hamilton as a tax reformer, and Gibson as an urban planner. Eventually, Byrne threw his support behind Degnan, who had served as his Attorney General since 1978.

Merlino ran a campaign focused on his record as President of the New Jersey Senate, making him sherpa of the Byrne legislative agenda and sometimes acting Governor. He emphasized his sponsorship of laws banning handguns and a prescription drug assistance bill targeted at senior citizens. His strategy was to get 70 percent of the vote in his native Mercer County and 20 and 25 percent in the New York and Philadelphia television markets, respectively.

As the campaign came to a close, no clear favorite had emerged. Roe and Florio remained in the lead, but Degnan, Merlino, and Kenneth A. Gibson rose in opinion polls. In the final days, the Byrne administration made a determined attempt to talk Gibson out of the race, in hopes of consolidating liberal support behind Degnan.

Crime and guns
Most Democratic candidates stressed the need to fight crime, supporting restoration of the death penalty, mandatory sentences without parole for gun crimes, limits on plea-bargaining, and tougher treatment of violent juvenile defenders. Merlino, for instance, emphasized his sponsorship of a ban on the sale or importation of handguns. Some candidates who supported a national ban nevertheless called Merlino's ban unworkable. It drew opposition from many rural legislators and sportsmen's and gun clubsand support from the National Coalition to Ban Handguns.

Two candidates broke from the pack on crime in different ways. In May, Florio was the sole Democrat endorsed by the National Rifle Association; the organization endorsed all of the Republican candidates. Gibson maintained his opposition to the death penalty.

Endorsements

Results

Turnout was much higher than projected. Neil Upmeyer, director of the State Division of Elections, had predicted 575,000 Democrats would vote, and some campaign consultants projected the number would actually be much smaller.

Florio won, dominating in South Jersey and displaying surprising strength throughout the state. In his victory speech, Florio suggested the fall campaign would be a referendum on the Reagan administration's spending cuts, which impliedly shifted the burden of governance to the states. "[New Jersey] will be the first state to confront the problems of the 80s," he said. "Whether or not we agree with the policies coming out of Washington, a massive shift in responsibility is taking place."

Republican primary

Candidates
Anthony Imperiale, State Assemblyman from Newark
Thomas Kean, former Speaker of the New Jersey General Assembly from Livingston
Lawrence F. "Pat" Kramer, mayor of Paterson and former Commissioner of Community Affairs
Richard McGlynn, former Superior Court Judge
Barry T. Parker, State Senator from Mount Holly
John K. Rafferty, mayor of Hamilton
Bo Sullivan, businessman 
James Wallwork, State Senator from Short Hills

Withdrew
Donald J. Albanese, State Assemblyman from Belvidere (ran for State Senate)

Declined
Raymond Bateman, former State Senator and nominee for Governor in 1977

The first candidate to enter the race for the Republican nomination was Assemblyman Donald J. Albanese, who announced even before the conclusion of the 1980 election.

Tom Kean, the former Assembly Speaker and runner-up in the 1977 primary, announced his campaign for the 1981 nomination in January. His announcement was shortly followed by that of Pat Kramer, the four-term mayor of Paterson. Both candidates entered the race as moderates, though emphasizing their appeal to supporters of President-elect Ronald Reagan following his overwhelming victory in the state.

The surprise entry into the race was businessman Bo Sullivan, whose political involvement had been limited to service as finance chair of the Essex County Republican organization. Sullivan laid the groundwork for his campaign at the 1980 Republican National Convention in Detroit, where despite being a complete unknown, he fêted the New Jersey delegates with a lavish poolside dinner. Beginning in January, Sullivan spent over $1 million of his own money to fund a television ad campaign throughout the state. Former Senator James Wallwork, an Essex County resident like Kean and Sullivan, ran as a firm conservative and Reagan supporter.

John K. Rafferty, mayor of suburban Hamilton Township, had run Reagan's New Jersey campaign for a time before being replaced by Raymond J. Donovan, who had become the most powerful Republican in the state after Reagan appointed him United States Secretary of Labor.

The candidate least aligned with Reagan was former judge Richard McGlynn of Short Hills, who referred to one candidate forum as a "Ronald Reagan sound-alike contest." Anthony Imperiale, a former independent State Senator who had led armed self-defense forces during the 1967 Newark riots, ran on a platform of "law and order."

Campaign
The candidates focused on presenting themselves as close, either personally or ideologically, to the new Reagan administration. Though he had been a loyal supporter of President Gerald Ford during the 1976 primary, Kean hired Roger Stone, who had served as Reagan's northeast coordinator and quoted Reagan in his campaign announcement. Kramer cited his  experience as a business and municipal executive as similar to Reagan's as Governor of California. Both Kramer and Kean embraced capital punishment as a solution to crime and drug trafficking in the state.

Kramer's campaign, which had broad establishment support in all regions of the state, suffered a setback when the legislature passed an open-primary law, which effectively abolished the powerful "county line" for the 1981 primary. At that point, Kramer had already secured nine out of 21 county endorsements, while none of the other candidates had more than two. "We were driving to lock the thing up by the filing deadline," Kramer said, "and then they changed the law on me."

Kramer's reputation also suffered from the perception of Paterson and Passaic County as corrupt, though he aggressively distanced himself from an ongoing probe into highway bid-rigging by voluntarily testifying before a grand jury. He referred to the bid-rigging conspiracy and attendant whisper campaign as "a cancer that was killing me."

Taxes, crime, and economic stagnation remained major issues as they had been in 1977. In May, Kean released his plan for a comprehensive series of tax cuts over four-years, which he said would work "hand in glove" with the supply-side economic program of the Reagan administration. He promised a two-phase halving of the state corporate income tax and a reduction of the sales tax. Kramer was highly critical of the Kean plan, calling it "a blueprint for defeat of the Republican Party in November." He recalled the 1977 campaign, where the early Republican polling lead had vanished after Raymond Bateman's economic program was heavily attacked by Governor Byrne. Kramer said, "If we insist on playing tax plan politics for the sake of a primary victory, as Tom Kean is doing once again, we are asking for a repeat of the 1977 Republican disaster." Kramer instead proposed that spending cuts and deregulation must precede any tax cut.

By the end of the primary, no clear dominating issue or leading candidate had become evident. Kean, Kramer, Sullivan, and Wallwork were all considered contenders for the nomination.

Hoax Wallwork assassination attempt
In April, less than a month after the attempted assassination of Ronald Reagan, Wallwork was the subject of a complicated hoax assassination attempt. Wallwork was speaking at the Veterans Administration hospital in East Orange when a patient yelled, “There’s a man with a gun and he’s going to shoot the senator.” Wallwork was safely escorted from the building. The hospital’s chief of police, Joseph Lancellotti, claimed to have unsuccessfully wrestled with the assassin before he escaped. Wallwork was assigned a police security detail to guard his home and escort him to campaign events. However, a Federal Bureau of Investigation inquest revealed that Lancelotti's claims were a hoax; further investigation revealed that he had a history of mental illness and similar hoaxes, including claims that he was shot at and kidnapped. He had previously served a prison sentence for calling in a false bomb threat.

Results

In his victory speech, Kean praised his opponents and said the fall campaign would be a referendum on the Byrne administration. "People are sick in this state about the loss of jobs, the rise in taxes, the expansion of government and the fear of crime that abounds in this state," he said.

General election

Candidates
James Florio, U.S. Representative from Runnemede (Democratic)
Bill Gahres (Down With Lawyers)
Harry J. Gaynor (Leadership By Example)
Jasper C. Gould (Contempt of Court)
Chester Grabowski (The Suffering Majority)
James E. Harris (Socialist Workers)
Thomas Kean, former Speaker of the New Jersey Assembly (Republican)
James A. Kolyer III (Middle Class Candidate)
Jules Levin (Socialist Labor)
Jack Moyers (Libertarian)
Ernest D. Pellerino (Law & Order)
Paul B. Rizzo (Independent-Honest-Available)
Charles C. Stone Jr. (Federalist)

Campaign 

The candidates primarily sought to contrast themselves on economic issues, down to the personal contrast between Kean as the scion of a wealthy political dynasty and Florio as the upstart grandson of ethnic immigrants. Kean continued his praise of Reagan's economic program and worked to link Florio to the Byrne administration, while Florio pointed to his record in Congress as an opponent of Reagan's agenda and leading proponent of environmental regulation. In one early television ad, Kean was shown playing bocce, an indication that he was appealing to ethnic Italian voters.

Despite the initial framing, Kean distanced himself from some of Reagan's platform as Reagan became less popular with Democrats in the state. Kean campaigned on a theme of change from the previous eight years of the Byrne administration, and Florio attempted to counter this message with television spots projection Florio as the candidate for change instead.

In the final days of the campaign, Vice President George H. W. Bush and U.S. Senator Bill Bradley campaigned with Kean and Florio, respectively. Bush and Kean emphasized that the race was about local issues, rather than a referendum on the White House; Bradley and Florio argued the opposite.

Debates 
In their first debate at Monmouth College, the lead candidates focused on economic issues. Kean blamed the state of the New Jersey economy of Byrne's tax and regulatory policies. Florio countered that a "drastic, across-the-board" corporate tax cut would threaten bankruptcy. Both candidates postured themselves as tough on crime, supporting capital punishment and new prison construction. Both supported Reagan's handling of the air controllers' strike, though only Kean did so enthusiastically.

A second debate before the New Jersey State Chamber of Commerce likewise focused on the economy. Florio attacked Kean's program as "voodoo economics" and compared it to similar plans which he said caused "financial chaos" in Wisconsin and Minnesota. Kean repeatedly challenged Florio to rule out an increase in the income tax, but Florio declined. After the debate, he said, "I am not prepared to unequivocally say that in the Florio administration there will never, never be a tax increase—that would be irresponsible."

Polling

Initial results
On election night, the results were extremely close. At least two television networks inaccurately declared Florio the winner. 

Kean proceeded to his campaign headquarters in Livingston to deliver a prepared concession but was stopped by his campaign manager. By the end of the night, Kean held a lead of 1,677 votes, and neither candidate would concede.

Ballot Security Task Force

Immediately after the election, New Jersey Democrats accused the Republican National Committee of intimidating minority voters in Newark, Camden, and Trenton via the Ballot Security Task Force, a private organization which sent out mailers to voters in these cities and posted armed off-duty police officers and large signs at certain precincts.

Recount
Florio, who later admitted he "assumed [he] was going to win," filed a petition for a formal recount in court. The process took another 27 days. In that time, both candidates set up transition offices to prepare to take office. On one occasion, both men showed up for a hotel ribbon-cutting ceremony with scissors.

Florio conceded on November 30 as Kean's grew slightly. "The people have selected Tom Kean," he said. Though the recount was still ongoing, Florio said that there was no longer any doubt that Kean had won and abandoned his request for a manual recount in Salem, Sussex, and Warren counties. Despite his concession, Florio called for further inquiries into the activities of the Ballot Security Task Force.

After 27 days, Kean was declared the winner on December 2.

References

1981
New Jersey
Gubernatorial
Voter suppression
November 1981 events in the United States